Vokesimurex bellegladeensis is a species of sea snail, a marine gastropod mollusk in the family Muricidae, the murex snails or rock snails.

Description

Distribution

References

 Petuch E.J. & Sargent D.M. (2011) Rare and unusual shells of the Florida Keys and adjacent areas. Wellington, Florida: MdM Publishing. 158 pp.

External links
  Rosenberg, G.; Moretzsohn, F.; García, E. F. (2009). Gastropoda (Mollusca) of the Gulf of Mexico, pp. 579–699 in: Felder, D.L. and D.K. Camp (eds.), Gulf of Mexico–Origins, Waters, and Biota. Texas A&M Press, College Station, Texas.

Gastropods described in 1963
Vokesimurex